Macay Holdings, Inc. is a company based in the Philippines engaged in the bottling and distribution of RC Cola and other soft drink beverages in the Philippines.

History

Macay Holdings, Inc. (Macay) was incorporated on October 16, 1930, as Maybank ATR Kim Eng Financial Corporation (MAKE), an investment holding company focused primarily on financial services.

On September 24, 2013, MAKE shareholder Maybank Kim Eng Holdings, Ltd. entered into a share purchase agreement with Mazy's Capital, Inc. (owned by the group of Alfredo Yao), wherein the latter purchased equivalent 89.75% of the outstanding shares of MAKE.

On December 3, 2013, ARC Refreshments Corporation (ARC) was incorporated as a wholly-owned subsidiary. ARC was established to consolidate the bottling, distribution, marketing and sales of RC Cola, Fruit Soda Orange, Juicy Lemon and Arcy's Rootbeer, all of which were held by Asiawide Refreshments Corporation (Asiawide) and Mega Asia Bottling Corporation (Mega Asia) since 2002.

Trading on MAKE was suspended by the PSE on January 2, 2014, pending submission of a comprehensive disclosure on the transaction. The PSE said this was covered by the rules on the backdoor listing. ARC acquired all of the bottling machinery and equipment of Mega Asia and the machinery, equipment, bottles and shells, inventory and other assets and certain liabilities of Asiawide. The suspension on the trading of MAKE shares was lifted on January 21, 2014, and trading was resumed the following day.

The Securities and Exchange Commission approved the company's change in corporate name to Macay Holdings, Inc. on January 30, 2014.

In 2014, Macay also acquired ARC Holdings, Inc. (AHI), holder of the trademark licenses of RC Cola in the Philippines. The group also obtained the master franchise of RC Cola for the ASEAN region.

In August 2020, Macay acquired Artemisplus Express Inc., which operates under the trade name Kitchen City.

In a September 6, 2022, disclosure to the PSE, Macay announced it will acquire 100% of RC Global Beverages Inc. which controls the international (non-US) rights to RC Cola for US$46 million. The transaction is subject to the finalization of a share purchase agreement and other closing conditions.

Brands
 RC Cola
 Fruit Soda Orange
 Fruit Soda Dalandan
 Juicy Lemon
 Arcy's Rootbeer
 Seetrus
 Rite 'n Lite
 Extra Joss Maxx Energy Drink

See also
 RC Cola Raiders

References

External links
Macay Holdings, Inc.
ARC Refreshments Corporation
RC Cola International

Companies based in Makati
Companies listed on the Philippine Stock Exchange
Drink companies of the Philippines
Food and drink companies established in 2014
Philippine companies established in 2014